Artyom Leonidovich Volkov (born 28 January 1985) is a Belarusian professional ice hockey player. He spent most of his career, which lasted from 2000 to 2021, in the Belarusian Extraliga, though also played four seasons in the Kontinental Hockey League. Internationally he played for the Belarus national team at five World Championships.

International
Volkov was named to the Belarus national team for the 2014 IIHF World Championship.

References

External links

1985 births
Living people
Expatriate ice hockey players in Russia
Belarusian ice hockey right wingers
Yunost Minsk players
HK Gomel players
HC Shakhtyor Soligorsk players
HC Dinamo Minsk players
Avangard Omsk players
People from Navapolatsk
Sportspeople from Vitebsk Region